The 1925 Connecticut Aggies football team was an American football team that represented Connecticut Agricultural College, now known as the University of Connecticut, as a member of the New England Conference (NEC) during the 1925 college football season.  In its third season under head coach Sumner Dole, Connecticut compiled a 3–5–1 record, going 0–3–1 against conference opponents.

Schedule

References

Connecticut
UConn Huskies football seasons
Connecticut Aggies football